Ust-Kyakhta (Khiaagtyn Adag) is a rural locality (a selo) in Kyakhtinsky District, Republic of Buryatia, Russia. The population was 1,752 as of 2010. There are 20 streets.

Geography 
Ust-Kyakhta is located 26 km northeast of Kyakhta (the district's administrative centre) by road. Khoronkhoy is the nearest rural locality.

References 

Rural localities in Kyakhtinsky District